The Home Economics Building is located on the campus of Torrance High School in Torrance, Los Angeles County, California.

It was built in 1922–1923, in the Mediterranean Revival style.

It was listed on the National Register of Historic Places in 1983.  The Home Economics Building is one of four on the campus of the Torrance High School listed on the NRHP, the other buildings are:
Auditorium
Torrance School
Main Building.

References

Torrance High School
Torrance High School
School buildings completed in 1923
Torrance High School
1923 establishments in California
Home economics education
Torrance High School